John Minds (April 9, 1871 – December 31, 1963) was an American football player and coach.  He played college football at the University of Pennsylvania as a fullback from 1894 to 1897.  Minds served as the head football coach at the University of Minnesota in 1898, compiling a record of 4–5.  He was elected to the College Football Hall of Fame as a player in 1962.

Head coaching record

References

External links
 
 

1871 births
1963 deaths
19th-century players of American football
American football fullbacks
Minnesota Golden Gophers football coaches
Penn Quakers football players
All-American college football players
College Football Hall of Fame inductees
People from Clearfield County, Pennsylvania
Players of American football from Pennsylvania